The Great Food Truck Race is a reality television and cooking series that originally aired on August 15, 2010, on Food Network, with Tyler Florence as the host. Billed as a cross between Cannonball Run and Top Chef, this late summer show features several competing teams of three who drive across the United States in their food trucks and make stops every week to sell food in different cities.

The fifteenth season premiered on June 5, 2022.

Format 
Every season, between six and nine food truck teams compete in a race where they must cook, sell, and adapt to different challenges in the hopes of winning $50,000 (and in some cases, their very own food truck). While taking a journey through a specific region or route, every week the food truck that makes the least profit is eliminated and sent home, while the rest of the food trucks continue on to the next city. They're usually given "seed money" at the beginning of each episode that goes towards grocery shopping. The teams are assigned different challenges every week for a chance to earn more money (usually in the form of selling the most of a special dish or making a version of a local delicacy for Tyler and a guest judge). They're also thrown obstacles that hinder their ability to make normal sales (for example, switching their menu to vegan food or being unable to restock supplies for the day).

In the first two seasons of the Great Food Truck Race, the competitors were seasoned, professional food truck operators who were competing for a cash prize (first season was $50,000 and second season was $100,000). In the following seasons (save for season six), food trucks were provided to novices (from home cooks to former restaurateurs) who have dreamt of owning and operating their very own food truck. In seasons three, four, and five, the winning team got the money and got to keep the food truck they were provided with by the show. In season six and onward, the show reverted to awarding the winning teams only the $50,000.

Episodes

Production
Bob Tuschman, general manager of the Food Network, had gotten several pitches for a food truck themed competition show before settling on the show that would become The Great Food Truck Race. He believed it to be ideal because it combined the Survivor-style reality show competition with the rising trend of food trucks. Tyler Florence was immediately on board and as the show grew and got renewed, so did the food truck scene. Florence believed the food truck trend grew in large part because of the economic slump around the early 2000s, and his show "helped invent an entirely new genre of restaurants".

References

External links
 Official website
 

Food Network original programming
Food reality television series
2010 American television series debuts
2010s American reality television series
2020s American reality television series
Food trucks